Ceryx crawshayi is a moth of the family Erebidae. It was described by George Hampson in 1901. It is found in the Democratic Republic of the Congo and Kenya.

References

Ceryx (moth)
Moths described in 1901
Moths of Africa